HMS Stromboli was initially a Steam Vessel second class (later reclassed as a First Class Sloop) designed by Sir William Symonds, Surveyor of the Navy, and built at Portsmouth. She was commissioned and participated in the bombardment of Acre in 1840, during the Russian War she was used as a troop transport in the Baltic in 1854, she was in the Black Sea and the Sea of Azov in 1855. Her last overseas posting was on the South East Coast of America. She was sold for breaking in August 1866.

Stromboli was the only vessel of this name in the Royal Navy.

Construction
She was ordered on 12 March 1838 with her laid in September at Portsmouth Dockyard. She was launched on 27 August 1839. She was completed for sea on 6 September 1840 at an initial cost of £41,420, including £19,248 for hull construction, £13,280 for her machinery and £8,712 for her fitting out.

Commissioned Service

First Commission
She was commissioned on 18 July 1840 under the command of Woodford John Williams, RN for service in the Mediterranean. She was with the British squadron off the coast of Syria in November 1840. She participated in the bombardment of Acre on 3 November. Commander William Louis, RN took command on 11 June 1841. She returned to Home Waters paying off at Woolwich in June 1843.

Second Commission
She commissioned under Commander Edward Plunkett on 13 October 1843 for service on the Irish Station and Particular Service. Commander Thomas Fisher, RN took command on 13 June 1845 followed by Commander Lord Amelius Wentworth Beauclerk, RN on 11 November 1847. She was paid off at Portsmouth into the Steam Reserve, on 17 September 1850.

Third Commission
She was commissioned on 18 August 1853 under commander Robert Hall, RN for service in the Mediterranean. As tensions increased with Russia her sailing for the Mediterranean was delayed. She joined Sir Robert Napier's Fleet for service in the Baltic after war with Russia was declared. During the Baltic campaign she was used as a troop Transport. She returned to Home Waters when the Fleet left the Baltic in September prior to the Winter freeze up. By December she was in the Mediterranean, joining the British Fleet in the Black Sea. Between 9 April and 7 September she participated in bombarding Sevastopol. After the occupation of Kertch, she participated in the naval excursion led by HMS Miranda into the Sea of Azov. In August 1855 Commander Cowper Phipps Coles, RN took command. Commander George Foster Burgess, RN took command on 27 February 1856. By March 1857, she is in a paid off state at Portsmouth.

Fourth Commission
She was commissioned on 9 December 1861 under Commander William Buller Fullerton Elphinstone, RN for service in Home Waters at Portsmouth. On  21 December (12 days later) she came under the command of Commander Aurthur Robert Henry, RN for service on the east coast of South America. When Commander Henry became invalided on 4 June 1863, Commander Alexander Philips, RN took command. She returned to Home Waters paying off on 8 June 1866.

Disposition
She was sold in August 1866 to White of East Cowes, Isle of Wight. She was towed to Cowes on 24 August 1866 for breaking.

Notes

Citations

References
 Lyon Winfield, The Sail & Steam Navy List, All the Ships of the Royal Navy 1815 to 1889, by David Lyon & Rif Winfield, published by Chatham Publishing, London © 2004, 
 Winfield, British Warships in the Age of Sail (1817 – 1863), by Rif Winfield, published by Seaforth Publishing, England © 2014, e, Chapter 11 Steam Paddle Vessels, Vessels acquired since November 1830, Stromboli Class
 Colledge, Ships of the Royal Navy, by J.J. Colledge, revised and updated by Lt Cdr Ben Warlow and Steve Bush, published by Seaforth Publishing, Barnsley, Great Britain, © 2020, e  (EPUB)
 The New Navy List, conducted by Joseph Allen, Esq., RN, London: Parker, Furnivall, and Parker, Military Library, Whitehall, MDCCCXLVII
 The Navy List, published by His Majesty's Stationery Office, London

Paddle sloops of the Royal Navy
Sloop classes